Korsaki is a rural locality (a village) in Andreyevskoye Rural Settlement, Kishertsky District, Perm Krai, Russia. The population was 7 as of 2010.

Geography 
Korsaki is located 22 km southeast of Ust-Kishert (the district's administrative centre) by road. Lyagushino is the nearest rural locality.

References 

Rural localities in Kishertsky District